Annika "Karolina" Virtanen Ramqvist (born 8 November 1976) is a prominent Swedish journalist and best-selling author.

Ramqvist's novels explore "contemporary issues of sexuality, commercialization, isolation and belonging". The Swedish newspaper Expressen said her fourth novel Den vita staden (published in Swedish in 2015 and later in English translation by Saskia Vogel for Black Cat/Grove Atlantic in 2017) "cemented Karolina Ramqvist's position as one of Sweden's most interesting authors." Ramqvist wrote the screenplay for the short film Cupcake (2014), which won the Short Grand Prix at the Warsaw Film Festival and Best Film at the Sleepwalkers International Short Film Festival in Tallinn. In 2015, Ramqvist won the PO Enquist Literary Prize, which is "given to a Nordic author who according to the jury has great artistic value and the potential to reach an international audience but has not yet had his or her international break through."

Ramqvist has been the editor-in-chief for the magazine Arena and a columnist at Dagens Nyheter. She became known after she published a private letter from Ulf Lundell in the Swedish feminist anthology  (1999).

She is married to journalist Fredrik Virtanen.

Bibliography 
 När svenska pojkar började dansa [When Swedish Boys Started Dancing], Stockholm : Bokförlaget DN, 1997, .
 More Fire, Stockholm : , 2002, .
 Nån där? Texter om framtidens kommunikation [Is anyone there? Texts on future communication], Stockholm : Premiss förlag, 2008, .
 Flickvännen [The Girlfriend], Stockholm : Wahlström & Widstrand, 2009, .
 Alltings början [The Beginning], Stockholm : Norstedts, 2012, .
 Fredskåren [Peace Corps], Stockholm : Myrios Novellförlag / Natur & Kultur, 2012, .
 Farväl, mitt kvinnofängelse [Farewell, My Female Prison], Stockholm : Novellix, 2013, 
 Den vita staden [The White City], Stockholm : Norstedts, 2015, 
 English translation by Saskia Vogel as The White City, New York : Black Cat/Grove Atlantic, 2017, 
 Det är natten [It Is the Night], Stockholm : Norstedts, 2016, 
 Extract published in English translation by Saskia Vogel as 'The Writer as Public Figure vs. The Writer Who Actually Writes', New York : The Literary Hub, February 27, 2017
 Björnkvinnan [The Bear Woman], Stockholm : Norstedts, 2019, 
 English translation by Saskia Vogel as The Bear Woman, Toronto : Coach House Books, 2022,

Prizes and distinctions 
1999 – Swedish Magazine Publishers Association's Media Rookie of the Year
2002 – SKAM:s Debut Prize for More Fire
2003 – Sweden's Essay Fund Prize for the essay "Den globala terapin" (Global Therapy) (Arena 3/2003)
2009 – Vi Magazine's Literary Prize for Flickvännen
2013 – City of Stockholm Cultural Stipendium for Alltings början
2015 – P.O. Enquist Literary Prize for Den vita staden
2015 – Albert Bonniers Stipendium Fund for Swedish Authors for Den vita staden

References

External links

Living people
1976 births
Swedish journalists